Minot State University (MSU or MiSU) is a public university in Minot, North Dakota.  Founded in 1913 as a normal school, Minot State University is the third-largest university in North Dakota, offering undergraduate and graduate degree programs.

Minot State University was founded in 1913 and has evolved from a normal school to a university. Three colleges comprise the university's academic offerings: Arts and Sciences, Business, and Education and Health Sciences. Nine master's degrees and one education specialist degree are offered in such areas as communication disorders, management, and mathematics. There is a mix of liberal arts and professional programs offering more than 60 majors at the undergraduate level. MSU is a member of the North Dakota University System, which comprises eleven institutions representing doctoral, master, baccalaureate, and community colleges. The State Board of Higher Education consists of nine members and is the governing board of the System. Minot State University has a Board of Regents acting as an advisory board and champion for the institution.

Minot State's mascot is the beaver and the school colors are red and green (though Maroon has sometimes been used in the past).  The campus newspaper is called the Red and Green. MSU's campus is at the base of North Hill, just west of Broadway.

History
MSU was established in 1913 as Minot Normal School, a two-year normal school devoted to preparing teachers for service in northwestern North Dakota. In 1924, the Normal School at Minot began issuing baccalaureate degrees, which necessitated a name change to Minot State Teacher's College. Over time the range of academic offerings expanded. The school's name was shortened to Minot State College in 1964 and it became a university sometime in the eighties.

Academics
Minot State University awards undergraduate degrees in more than 60 courses of study and graduate degrees in 10 fields of study.

MSU is composed of four main academic divisions:
 College of Arts and Sciences
 7 academic departments
 College of Business
 3 academic departments
 College of Education and Health Sciences
 4 academic departments
 Graduate School

University rankings
It was ranked 976th on the 2013–2014 PayScale College Salary Report and 1346th on the 2013 PayScale College Education Value Rankings.

Accreditation 

Minot State University is fully accredited by the Higher Learning Commission. Business Programs at MSU and in the College of Business Graduate School are fully accredited by the IACBE. The Bachelors & Master's degrees in Business Education are accredited by NCATE.

Other accreditation:
 National Council for Accreditation of Teacher Education
 National Association of Schools of Music
 Council on Education of the Deaf
 Council on Academic Accreditation of the American Speech-Language-Hearing Association
 Council on Social Work Education–Baccalaureate level
 International Assembly for Collegiate Business Education
 National League for Nursing Accrediting Commission, Inc.
 National Association of School Psychologists
 North Dakota Board of Nursing

Gordon B. Olson Library 

Completed the spring of 1992, the Gordon B. Olson Library presently serves an enrollment of more than 3,000 students. The three story facility features seating for 800 students, room for more than 500,000 volumes, as well as computer labs, and a microforms area.

Dr. Gordon B. Olson came to Minot State University during the summer of 1967 and led the university through a period of growth and change. In 1967 enrollment was slightly more than 2,000. During Dr. Olson's tenure, MSU added a significant number of undergraduate and graduate programs. New undergraduate degrees included nursing, social work, and criminal justice. Graduate programs expanded from only one program in 1967 to 13 programs this year. Each of these programs addresses societal needs and the needs of students who pursue careers in these fields.

Athletics

Minot State University athletics compete in the Northern Sun Intercollegiate Conference (NSIC) which is a part of NCAA Division II

MSU's sports program offers football, both men's and women's club hockey, basketball, cross country, indoor/outdoor track and field, golf, baseball, wrestling, women's soccer, volleyball and fast pitch softball.

Minot State's ice hockey team won the ACHA Men's Division I national championship in 2013.

Wellness Center

The Minot State Wellness Center’s tagline is “Be well” and promotes a comprehensive approach to wellness and healthy living on campus for students, faculty, and staff. Their 8 Dimensions in Wellness approach promotes wellness in all areas: emotional, physical, occupational, intellectual, social, spiritual, environment, and cultural. The Wellness Center features rock climbing, exercise equipment, weight rooms, intramural gym space, group exercise classes, and wellness events with unlimited access for students.

Facilities
Campus facilities include an amphitheatre, indoor theatre, recital hall, the Gordon B. Olson library, a football field, the MSU Wellness Center, and the MSU Dome arena.  The Student Union includes a bookstore, convenience store, dining center, and lounge areas.  MSU has four student residence halls and three apartment complexes.

Notable alumni

 Dale Brown – former LSU basketball head coach (1972–97)
 Arthur G. Crane – former Governor of Wyoming (1949–51)
 Ernst Ising – physicist credited with developing Ising model (1947–48)
 Gary Cederstrom – MLB umpire
 Scott Deibert – former Canadian football player
 Josh Duhamel – Emmy Award-winning actor and model
 Ray Giacoletti – former North Dakota State (1997–2000), Eastern Washington (2000–04), Utah (2004–07) and Drake (2013-16) basketball head coach
 Rocky Hager – former North Dakota State (1997–2003) and Northeastern University (2004–09) football head coach
 Brynhild Haugland – longest-serving state legislator in history of United States
 Joan Heckaman – current member of North Dakota Senate, 23rd District (2007–Present)
 Randy Hedberg – former NFL quarterback,  later MSU football head coach (1982–89)
 Mikey Hoeven – former First Lady of North Dakota, wife of Senator John Hoeven
 David C. Jones, General, USAF – former Chairman of the Joint Chiefs of Staff (1978–82)
 Douglas Kary – current member of Montana House of Representatives, 48th District (2010–Present)
 Stanley W. Lyson – member of North Dakota Senate, 1st District (1999–2014)
 Mary Manross – former mayor of Scottsdale, Arizona (2000–08)
 Mary Sherman Morgan – rocket fuel scientist credited with invention of liquid fuel Hydyne in 1957, which powered Jupiter-C rocket that boosted first U.S. satellite
 David O'Connell – member of North Dakota Senate, 6th District (1989–2014)
 Sean Ortiz – Canadian Football League defensive lineman, BC Lions (2008–12)
 Charles Payne – Fox Business Channel contributor (Cavuto on Business, Cashin' In, Bulls and Bears)
 Wade Regier – former Minot State Beavers men's ice hockey coach (2010–2021), ACHA D-I National Championship (2013)
 A. R. Shaw – former educator and mayor of Mandan, North Dakota (1968–72)
 John Warner –  member of North Dakota Senate, 4th District (2004–2014)
 Lisa Wolf – member of North Dakota House of Representatives, 3rd District (2007–2010)

References

External links 
 
 Minot State Athletics website

 
Public universities and colleges in North Dakota
Tourist attractions in Minot, North Dakota
Educational institutions established in 1913
Buildings and structures in Minot, North Dakota
Education in Ward County, North Dakota
1913 establishments in North Dakota